Brusdar Javier Graterol (born August 26, 1998) is a Venezuelan professional baseball pitcher for the Los Angeles Dodgers of Major League Baseball (MLB). He made his MLB debut in 2019 for the Minnesota Twins.

Career

Minnesota Twins
Graterol signed with the Minnesota Twins as an international free agent in August 2014. He made his professional debut in 2015 with the Dominican Summer League Twins where he was 0–1 with a 2.45 earned run average (ERA) in four starts. He missed the 2016 season after undergoing Tommy John surgery. He returned from the injury in 2017 and pitched for the Gulf Coast Twins and Elizabethton Twins, going 4–1 with a 2.70 ERA in 10 games (seven starts). 

Graterol started 2018 with the Cedar Rapids Kernels (with whom he was named a Midwest League all-star) and was promoted to the Fort Myers Miracle in June. In 19 starts between the two teams, he went 8–4 with a 2.74 ERA and a 1.15 WHIP. 

He began 2019 with the Pensacola Blue Wahoos, earning Southern League all-star honors.

On September 1, 2019, the Twins selected Graterol's contract and promoted him to the major leagues. He made his major-league debut that day versus the Detroit Tigers, pitching a scoreless inning in relief. In 2019 with the Twins, he was 1–1 with a 4.66 ERA, making 10 appearances totaling  innings while striking out 10 batters.

Los Angeles Dodgers
On February 10, 2020, the Twins traded Graterol, Luke Raley, and the 67th pick in the 2020 Major League Baseball draft to the Los Angeles Dodgers for Kenta Maeda, Jaír Camargo, and cash considerations. In the pandemic-shortened 2020 season, he appeared in 23 games (two starts) for the Dodgers and allowed eight earned runs in 23 innings, for a 3.09 ERA. In the postseason, he pitched one scoreless inning to pick up the save in the second game of the Wild Card Series and  scoreless innings in the second game of the 2020 NLDS. In the 2020 NLCS against the Atlanta Braves, he pitched in four games, allowing three runs in  innings and in the 2020 World Series against the Tampa Bay Rays he pitched two scoreless innings over three games as the Dodgers won the championship.   

In 2021, Graterol pitched in 34 games for the Dodgers, with a 3–0 record and 4.59 ERA. In the postseason, he pitched one inning in the Wild Card Game,  innings in the 2021 NLDS and  innings in the 2021 NLCS, allowing only one run on four hits while striking out seven.
 
In 2022, Graterol pitched in 46 games and was 2–4 with a 3.26 ERA in  innings. He also picked up four saves, with his first career save being on June 26 against the Braves.

On January 13, 2023, Graterol agreed to a one-year, $1.225 million contract with the Dodgers, avoiding salary arbitration.

Personal life
Graterol  grew up near Calabozo, Venezuela, and was raised by his mother, Ismalia, and grandparents. He married Allison Landa on January 22, 2021.

Graterol's nickname is "Bazooka."

See also
 List of Major League Baseball players from Venezuela

References

External links

1998 births
Living people
People from Calabozo
People from Guárico
Venezuelan expatriate baseball players in the United States
Major League Baseball players from Venezuela
Major League Baseball pitchers
Minnesota Twins players
Los Angeles Dodgers players
Dominican Summer League Twins players
Venezuelan expatriate baseball players in the Dominican Republic
Gulf Coast Twins players
Elizabethton Twins players
Cedar Rapids Kernels players
Fort Myers Miracle players
Pensacola Blue Wahoos players
Rochester Red Wings players
Oklahoma City Dodgers players